Wakpala is an unincorporated community in Corson County, South Dakota, United States, on the west side of the Missouri River, north-northwest of Mobridge. Although not tracked by the Census Bureau, Wakpala has been assigned the ZIP code of 57658. Wakpala is within the boundaries of the Standing Rock Indian Reservation, and its name loosely translates to "creek" in the Lakota language, with Oak Creek running south on its eastern edge.

Chief Gall (Piji, Phizí) is buried at Saint Elizabeth Episcopal Cemetery here and Chief Sitting Bull (Tȟatȟáŋka Íyotake) is possibly buried under a concrete bust bearing his name a few miles south of town in the Mobridge area. Sitting Bull was originally buried at Fort Yates, North Dakota but an effort was made to exhume his bones and rebury him at the present site, but some individuals  assert that the bones moved are not his.

The annual Wakpala Wacipi (dance or powwow) is held on the last weekend in August.

Demographics

References

Unincorporated communities in Corson County, South Dakota
Unincorporated communities in South Dakota